Boris Mathis (born 15 August 1997) is a French professional footballer who plays as a forward for Guingamp II.

Career
Mathis is a youth product of Lyon. Mathis made his professional debut for Metz in a 3–0 Ligue 1 loss against Lyon on 5 April 2017. He left Metz at the end of 2016–17 before signing a two-year deal with English club Everton in July 2017, where he joined the team's Under 23 squad. He moved on loan to Northampton Town in January 2018. In July 2019, Mathis joined newly-promoted Ligue 2 side Rodez following his release from Everton. On 30 January 2020, Mathis joined Championnat National side Villefranche on loan until the end of the season.

On 1 July 2021, Mathis signed for the reserve side of Guingamp who compete in Championnat National 2.

References

External links

Maxifoot Profile
Sofoot Profile

Living people
1997 births
People from Bron
Sportspeople from Lyon Metropolis
French footballers
Footballers from Auvergne-Rhône-Alpes
Association football forwards
Ligue 1 players
Ligue 2 players
Championnat National players
Championnat National 3 players
Olympique Lyonnais players
FC Metz players
Everton F.C. players
Northampton Town F.C. players
Rodez AF players
FC Villefranche Beaujolais players
French expatriate footballers
French expatriate sportspeople in England
Expatriate footballers in England